Bolo do caco is a circular Madeiran flatbread, shaped like a cake and thus called bolo (Portuguese for 'cake'). It is traditionally cooked on a caco, a flat basalt stone slab. The bread is usually served with garlic butter, or eaten as a sandwich with octopus, espetada, milho frito or as a prego (steak) sandwich.

See also
 List of breads
 List of Portuguese dishes

External links
BBC Recipe

References

Madeiran cuisine
Portuguese cuisine
Yeast breads
Flatbreads